Vénissieux station (French: Gare de Vénissieux) is a railway station in the town Vénissieux, a suburb of Lyon, Lyon Metropolis, France. Opened on 1 July 1858, it is served by the SNCF's TER Auvergne-Rhône-Alpes.

The station is served by regional trains to Lyon, Bourgoin-Jallieu and Saint-André-le-Gaz.

Local transport
It is well connected to local public transport. It is the southeastern terminus of Lyon Metro Line D as well as one of the main stops of Lyon tramway Line 4.

Service

References

Lyon Metro stations
Railway stations in Lyon Metropolis